OGLE-2005-BLG-169L is a dim and distant magnitude 20 galactic bulge star located about 2,700 parsecs away in the constellation Sagittarius. If it is a main sequence star, then it is most likely a red dwarf with about half of the mass of the Sun. Other possibilities are a white dwarf star, or (less likely) a neutron star or black hole.

Planetary system 
In 2006, an Uranus-mass extrasolar planet was detected by gravitational microlensing around this star.

See also 
 List of extrasolar planets
 OGLE-2005-BLG-390L
 Optical Gravitational Lensing Experiment or OGLE

References

External links 
 

M-type main-sequence stars
Planetary systems with one confirmed planet
Sagittarius (constellation)
Gravitational lensing